Ivan Serhiyovych Fedorov (born 29 August 1988) is a Ukrainian politician who was elected the mayor of Melitopol in 2020. He was previously the first deputy head of the Zaporizhzhia Oblast Council and a member of the Melitopol City Council.

Career 
Fedorov was elected to 6th convocation of the Melitopol city council. In 2015, he was elected first deputy head of the 7th convocation of the Zaporizhzhia Oblast Council. In 2020, he succeeded Serhii Minko as the mayor of Melitopol.

On 6 March 2022, Fedorov was awarded the Order for Courage III Class for significant personal contribution to the protection of state sovereignty and territorial integrity of Ukraine, courage and selfless actions shown during the organization of defense of settlements from Russian army during the Battle of Melitopol.

On 11 March 2022, the deputy head of the office of the president Kyrylo Tymoshenko stated that Fedorov had been "arrested and abducted by the Russian military." Ukrainian officials reported that "A group of 10 occupiers kidnapped the mayor of Melitopol, Ivan Fedorov," Ukraine's parliament said on Twitter. "He refused to cooperate with the enemy". This was corroborated by Anton Herashchenko and videos released by CNN of Russian soldiers outside a city government building.

Subsequent to the actions of the Russian military, the prosecutor general's office of the self-proclaimed Luhansk People's Republic opened a criminal case against Fedorov. Their investigators stated that he "provided financial and other assistance to the banned nationalist organization Right Sector in committing terrorist crimes against civilians in Donbas." The following day, Saturday, 12 March, former city council member Halyna Danylchenko was installed by the Russian occupation forces with a claim of "acting mayor".

On 12 March 2022, the president of Ukraine, Volodymyr Zelenskyy, stated that Fedorov was being tortured. Zelenskyy requested his release. On 16 March, Fedorov was freed from captivity and thanked President Zelenskyy in a phone call posted online. Some Ukrainian officials claimed he was freed in a "special operation". Zelenskyy's press aide Daria Zarivna however later claimed he was exchanged for nine Russian conscripts captured by Ukrainian forces; it was later confirmed by The New Yorker that this prisoner exchange took place in Kamianske.

On 16 April, Fedorov attended Easter services in St. Peter's Basilica, along with Maria Mezentseva, Olena Khomenko and Rustem Umerov, in front seats. Pope Francis stated "Christ is risen" in Ukrainian at the service.

Personal life 
Fedorov was born 29 August 1988. In a 2019 declaration, he stated that he owned an apartment in Melitopol and a house and land in Zaporizhia.

See also
List of kidnappings

Notes

References 

1988 births
2020s missing person cases
21st-century Ukrainian politicians
Formerly missing people
Living people
Kidnapped politicians
Mayors of Melitopol
Members of the Zaporizhzhia Oblast Council
Missing person cases in Ukraine
Kidnapped Ukrainian people
People from Melitopol
Place of birth missing (living people)
Recipients of the Order For Courage, 3rd class
Southern Ukraine campaign
Ukrainian city councillors
Ukrainian prisoners of war